"Kentucky Waltz" is a 1946 song written and performed  by Bill Monroe.  The song was Bill Monroe's most successful release on the Country & Western charts peaking at number three.

Cover versions
In 1951 Eddy Arnold recorded his version of the song which reached number one on the Country & Western Best Seller charts.
Also in 1951, a version by Rosemary Clooney went to #24 on the Cashbox pop chart.
A cover of the song appeared on English folk singer Bob Davenport's 1973 album Pal Of My Cradle Days.

See also
 List of Billboard number-one country songs of 1951

References

1946 songs
Eddy Arnold songs
Bill Monroe songs
Johnny Burnette songs
Bluegrass songs
Songs written by Bill Monroe
Songs about Kentucky